Xavier Tanner (born 2 May 1956) is a former Australian rules footballer who played with North Melbourne and Melbourne in the Victorian Football League (VFL).

A centreman, Tanner was recruited to the VFL from Wodonga in the Ovens & Murray Football League. He played in North Melbourne's 1977 premiership side and their losing grand final the following season. After exactly 100 games with North Melbourne he joined his old coach Ron Barassi at Melbourne in 1984 and spent the last two seasons of his career with them.

Tanner is currently the assistant principal at Wanganui Park Secondary College in Shepparton, Victoria.

Tanner's father, Gerald Tanner, played one game for Richmond in 1941.

References

1956 births
Living people
Melbourne Football Club players
North Melbourne Football Club players
North Melbourne Football Club Premiership players
Wodonga Football Club players
Australian rules footballers from Victoria (Australia)
People from Wodonga
One-time VFL/AFL Premiership players